Malaysia Rugby League Premier is the top flight of rugby union league in Malaysia.

Introduced in 2004, it was formerly known as MRU Super League, catered only to the top eight rugby union clubs in the country.  The Malaysian Rugby Union (MRU) is the organizer of the league.

In 2017, the Super League and National Inter Club Championship (NICC) will be replaced with a more structured and more organized league system, an effort by Malaysia Rugby to be a professional sport in 2018. It also will attract more publicity and coverage by sponsors and local media to promote this sport to local citizens. The Super League will be renamed as Malaysia Rugby League Premier, and two new leagues were introduced to replace NICC, the Malaysia Rugby League Division 1 and Malaysia Rugby League Division 2.

Champions

Teams

These teams will be playing in the Malaysia Rugby League Premier 2017 season.

  Cobra RC
  NS Wanderers RC
  UPM Angels
  UiTM Lions
  Kelab Sukan DBKL
  ASAS RC
  Panthers Blowpipes
  Keris Conlay RC
  Iskandar Raiders
  SSTMI Tsunami
  Mersing Eagles
  Politeknik Merlimau

History

Foreign players

Players

Records

See also

 MRU Super League seasons
 MRU Super Cup
 Malaysia Rugby League Division 1
 Malaysia Rugby League Division 2
 Sukandaily - Kejohanan Liga Ragbi Malaysia

External links
 Malaysian Rugby Union's website

  
 
National rugby union premier leagues
Sports leagues established in 2004
2004 establishments in Malaysia